Joe Knetsch is an American historian and author. In 2019 his book of essays about the history of Tallahassee, Florida and its surroundings was published.

Knetsch has a B.S. from Western Michigan University, an M.A. from Florida Atlantic University and a Ph.D. from Florida State University. He has taught at the secondary and collegiate levels, and worked as a historian for the Department of Environmental Protection and Department of Natural Resources. The University of South Florida has a collection of his papers.

Knetsch has written papers on the history of surveying and various aspects of Florida's history and landscape. He has written about Hamilton Disston. He has also written about Pembroke Pines and the Armed Occupation Act of 1842. He translated an 1856 letter from Smith Mowry to Jefferson Davis about Indian Key, Florida.

Knetsch lives in Tallassee with his wife Linda.

An H-Net review of his book on the Seminole Wars lauded the images, maps, and diagrams he included.

Bibliography
Forts, Ports, Canals and Wars: An Uncommon History of Tallahassee & Surrounding Areas (2019)
Edge of Armageddon: Florida and the Cuban Missile Crisis, Outskirts Press, a collection of essays edited with Nick Wynne
History of the Third Seminole War, 1849-1858, Casemate publishing, written with John and Mary Lou Missall
Fear and Anxiety on the Florida Frontier,  2015
Florida in the Spanish-American War, 2011, with Nick Wynne
Robert Ker and the Resurvey of the Forbes Purchase Line, 2007
Faces On The Frontier, 2006
The Big Arredondo Grant: A Study in Confusion, 1991

References

Writers from Tallahassee, Florida
21st-century American historians
21st-century American male writers
Year of birth missing (living people)
Living people
Florida Atlantic University alumni
Western Michigan University alumni
Florida State University alumni
Historians of Florida
Historians from Florida
American male non-fiction writers